Roberto Maximiliano Correa Tolosa (born 22 November 1989) is an Argentine footballer who plays for Instituto de Córdoba on loan from Godoy Cruz Antonio Tomba as a midfielder.

References

External links

1989 births
Living people
Association football midfielders
Argentine footballers
Godoy Cruz Antonio Tomba footballers
Instituto footballers
Argentine Primera División players